An incomplete list of films produced in Japan ordered by year in the 1920s.  For an A-Z of films see :Category:Japanese films.  Also see cinema of Japan.

1920–1921

1922

1923

1924

1925

1926–1929

References

External links
 Japanese film at the Internet Movie Database

1920s
Japanese
Films